2013 Urawa Red Diamonds season.

Final Table

Squad

Results

J1 League

Emperors Cup

J-League Cup

Statistics

Overview

Goalscorers

League position by matchday

Appearances and goals

Transfers

In

Out

References

External links
 J.League official site

Urawa Red Diamonds seasons